Babelomurex cariniferus, common name Babel's latiaxis, is a species of sea snail, a marine gastropod mollusc in the family Muricidae, the murex snails or rock snails.

Distribution
Babelomurex cariniferus is present from the Mediterranean Sea to the west coast of Africa (Canaries, Cape Verde, Angola).

This species (as junior synonym Latiaxis babelis) is listed in the IUCN Red List, because it is thought to be endemic to Malta.

Habitat
These sea snails live in the coral reef among corals and sponges. They can be found from a few meters to more than 1000.

Description
The shell surface may be whitish or dark greyish. These shells are variably shaped. They show numerous flattened spires with very thorny axial ribs. The keels of the whorls are adorned with several spiniform scales. A corneous operculum is present.

This species is quite similar to Babelomurex benoiti, but Babelomurex cariniferus is more variable in feature and sculpture and differs in the number of spiniform scales.

Biology
These uncommon infralittoral sea snails are specialist feeders. In fact they feed exclusively on the polyps of the colonies of scleractinian stony corals.

References

External links
 NCBI

Bibliography
 Cossignani T. (2010) Validazione di Babelomurex tectumsinensis (Deshayes, 1856). Malacologia Mostra Mondiale 66: 19
 Emilio Rolan - Malacological Fauna from the Cape Verde Archipelago
 Gofas, S.; Afonso, J.P.; Brandào, M. (Ed.). (S.a.). Conchas e Moluscos de Angola = Coquillages et Mollusques d'Angola. [Shells and molluscs of Angola]. Universidade Agostinho / Elf Aquitaine Angola: Angola. 140 pp.
 Gofas, S.; Le Renard, J.; Bouchet, P. (2001). Mollusca, in: Costello, M.J. et al. (Ed.) (2001). European register of marine species: a check-list of the marine species in Europe and a bibliography of guides to their identification. Collection Patrimoines Naturels, 50: pp. 180–213
 Repetto G., Orlando F. & Arduino G. (2005): Conchiglie del Mediterraneo, Amici del Museo "Federico Eusebio", Alba, Italy

cariniferus
Gastropods described in 1834
Molluscs of the Atlantic Ocean
Molluscs of the Mediterranean Sea
Molluscs of the Canary Islands
Molluscs of Angola
Gastropods of Cape Verde
Fauna of Malta
Taxobox binomials not recognized by IUCN